The 1983–84 Phoenix Suns season was the 16th season for the Phoenix Suns of the National Basketball Association. The Suns were in the playoffs for the seventh consecutive season, extending a then-franchise record. The Suns eliminated their first round opponent, Portland, three games to two before defeating the Utah Jazz and NBA leading scorer, Adrian Dantley, four games to two. In the Western Conference Finals, the Suns lost to the Los Angeles Lakers in six games. The team was led by head coach John MacLeod, in his 11th year with the Suns, and played all home games in Arizona Veterans Memorial Coliseum.

Walter Davis led the Suns in scoring with 20 points per game. Larry Nance, who finished the season fourth in the NBA in blocks per game for the second straight year, was second in team scoring at 17.7. Davis returned to the All-Star Game, the only Sun from the season to be selected to do so. Maurice Lucas again averaged a double-double again for the Suns with 16 points and 10 rebounds per game.

Although Nance did not earn his first All-Star selection until the next season, he did participate in the NBA's first Slam Dunk Contest on All-Star Weekend. While Julius Erving ("Dr. J") provided a memorable dunk from the foul line, it was Nance who was crowned the league's first Slam Dunk champion.

Draft picks

Roster

Regular season

Standings

Record vs. opponents

Playoffs

Game log

|- align="center" bgcolor="#ccffcc"
| 1
| April 18
| @ Portland
| W 113–106
| James Edwards (23)
| Larry Nance (9)
| Walter Davis (13)
| Memorial Coliseum12,666
| 1–0
|- align="center" bgcolor="#ffcccc"
| 2
| April 20
| @ Portland
| L 116–122
| Walter Davis (25)
| Davis, Lucas (5)
| Alvan Adams (5)
| Memorial Coliseum12,666
| 1–1
|- align="center" bgcolor="#ccffcc"
| 3
| April 22
| Portland
| W 106–103
| Walter Davis (27)
| Lucas, Nance (10)
| Walter Davis (10)
| Arizona Veterans Memorial Coliseum11,531
| 2–1
|- align="center" bgcolor="#ffcccc"
| 4
| April 24
| Portland
| L 110–113
| Walter Davis (29)
| Maurice Lucas (10)
| Davis, Macy (7)
| Arizona Veterans Memorial Coliseum14,660
| 2–2
|- align="center" bgcolor="#ccffcc"
| 5
| April 26
| @ Portland
| W 117–105
| Walter Davis (29)
| Maurice Lucas (12)
| Walter Davis (10)
| Memorial Coliseum12,666
| 3–2

|- align="center" bgcolor="#ffcccc"
| 1
| April 29
| @ Utah
| L 95–105
| Walter Davis (21)
| James Edwards (8)
| Walter Davis (7)
| Salt Palace12,403
| 0–1
|- align="center" bgcolor="#ccffcc"
| 2
| May 2
| @ Utah
| W 102–97
| Walter Davis (28)
| Maurice Lucas (15)
| Kyle Macy (7)
| Salt Palace12,689
| 1–1
|- align="center" bgcolor="#ccffcc"
| 3
| May 4
| Utah
| W 106–94
| Walter Davis (30)
| Maurice Lucas (14)
| Kyle Macy (7)
| Arizona Veterans Memorial Coliseum14,660
| 2–1
|- align="center" bgcolor="#ccffcc"
| 4
| May 6
| Utah
| W 111–110 (OT)
| Walter Davis (32)
| Alvan Adams (15)
| Maurice Lucas (6)
| Arizona Veterans Memorial Coliseum14,660
| 3–1
|- align="center" bgcolor="#ffcccc"
| 5
| May 8
| @ Utah
| L 106–118
| Maurice Lucas (19)
| Maurice Lucas (12)
| Macy, Westphal (6)
| Salt Palace12,560
| 3–2
|- align="center" bgcolor="#ccffcc"
| 6
| May 10
| Utah
| W 102–82
| Walter Davis (21)
| Larry Nance (9)
| Davis, Macy (6)
| Arizona Veterans Memorial Coliseum14,660
| 4–2

|- align="center" bgcolor="#ffcccc"
| 1
| May 12
| @ Los Angeles
| L 94–110
| Walter Davis (24)
| Larry Nance (15)
| Kyle Macy (10)
| The Forum12,825
| 0–1
|- align="center" bgcolor="#ffcccc"
| 2
| May 15
| @ Los Angeles
| L 102–118
| Larry Nance (29)
| Larry Nance (9)
| Walter Davis (8)
| The Forum16,578
| 0–2
|- align="center" bgcolor="#ccffcc"
| 3
| May 18
| Los Angeles
| W 135–127 (OT)
| Walter Davis (34)
| Maurice Lucas (17)
| Kyle Macy (6)
| Arizona Veterans Memorial Coliseum14,660
| 1–2
|- align="center" bgcolor="#ffcccc"
| 4
| May 20
| Los Angeles
| L 115–126
| Larry Nance (27)
| Maurice Lucas (10)
| Walter Davis (7)
| Arizona Veterans Memorial Coliseum14,660
| 1–3
|- align="center" bgcolor="#ccffcc"
| 5
| May 23
| @ Los Angeles
| W 126–121
| Walter Davis (27)
| Larry Nance (13)
| Kyle Macy (12)
| The Forum16,848
| 2–3
|- align="center" bgcolor="#ffcccc"
| 6
| May 25
| Los Angeles
| L 97–99
| Walter Davis (26)
| Maurice Lucas (13)
| Kyle Macy (8)
| Arizona Veterans Memorial Coliseum14,660
| 2–4
|-

Awards and honors

All-Star
 Walter Davis was selected as a reserve for the Western Conference in the 1984 NBA All-Star Game. It was his fifth All-Star selection.
 Larry Nance competed in the inaugural NBA Slam Dunk Contest. Nance became the league's first Dunk champion, defeating Julius Erving in the final round.
 The other Suns player receiving All-Star votes was Maurice Lucas (302,258).

Player statistics

Season

|- align="center" bgcolor=""
|  || 70 || 13 || 20.7 || .462 || .000 || .825 || 4.6 || 3.1 || 1.0 || .4 || 9.6
|- align="center" bgcolor="#f0f0f0"
|  || 78 || 70 || 32.6 || .512 || .230 || style="background:#FF8800;color:#423189;" | .863 || 2.6 || style="background:#FF8800;color:#423189;" | 5.5 || 1.4 || .2 || style="background:#FF8800;color:#423189;" | 20.0
|- align="center" bgcolor=""
|  || 72 || 67 || 26.3 || .536 || .000 || .720 || 4.8 || 2.6 || .3 || .4 || 14.7
|- align="center" bgcolor="#f0f0f0"
|  || 80 || 34 || 17.8 || .448 || .262 || .787 || 1.5 || 2.2 || .7 || .1 || 8.3
|- align="center" bgcolor=""
|  || 29 || 9 || 17.7 || .346 || .000 || .345 || 2.3 || 1.8 || 1.4 || .4 || 1.6
|- align="center" bgcolor="#f0f0f0"
|  || 75 || 69 || 30.8 || .497 || .000 || .765 || style="background:#FF8800;color:#423189;" | 9.7 || 2.7 || .7 || .5 || 15.9
|- align="center" bgcolor=""
|  || style="background:#FF8800;color:#423189;" | 82 || 45 || 29.3 || .501 || .329 || .833 || 2.3 || 4.3 || style="background:#FF8800;color:#423189;" | 1.5 || .1 || 10.1
|- align="center" bgcolor="#f0f0f0"
|  || style="background:#FF8800;color:#423189;" | 82 || style="background:#FF8800;color:#423189;" | 82 || style="background:#FF8800;color:#423189;" | 35.4 || style="background:#FF8800;color:#423189;" | .576† || .000 || .707 || 8.3 || 2.6 || 1.0 || style="background:#FF8800;color:#423189;" | 2.1 || 17.7
|- align="center" bgcolor=""
|  || 69 || 8 || 14.3 || .603† || .000 || .683 || 3.1 || 1.0 || .2 || .3 || 4.7
|- align="center" bgcolor="#f0f0f0"
|  || 61 || 4 || 14.0 || .545 || style="background:#FF8800;color:#423189;" | 1.000 || .693 || 3.2 || 1.1 || .3 || .2 || 5.6
|- align="center" bgcolor=""
|  || 50 || 0 || 11.7 || .478 || . || .690 || 2.1 || 0.9 || .5 || .2 || 4.5
|- align="center" bgcolor="#f0f0f0"
|  || 65 || 5 || 11.3 || .444 || .500 || .778 || 1.5 || 0.7 || .3 || .3 || 2.6
|- align="center" bgcolor=""
|  || 59 || 2 || 14.7 || .460 || .269 || .824 || 0.7 || 2.5 || .7 || .1 || 7.0
|- align="center" bgcolor="#f0f0f0"
| * || 22 || 2 || 14.0 || .479 || . || .571 || 2.8 || 0.6 || .6 || .1 || 7.4
|}

* – Stats with the Suns.
† – Minimum 300 field goals made.

Playoffs

|- align="center" bgcolor=""
|  || style="background:#FF8800;color:#423189;" | 17 || 0 || 18.4 || .421 || . || .679 || 5.1 || 2.5 || 1.0 || .6 || 8.4
|- align="center" bgcolor="#f0f0f0"
|  || style="background:#FF8800;color:#423189;" | 17 || style="background:#FF8800;color:#423189;" | 17 || 36.6 || .535 || .273 || .897 || 2.7 || style="background:#FF8800;color:#423189;" | 6.4 || style="background:#FF8800;color:#423189;" | 1.7 || .2 || style="background:#FF8800;color:#423189;" | 24.9
|- align="center" bgcolor=""
|  || style="background:#FF8800;color:#423189;" | 17 || style="background:#FF8800;color:#423189;" | 17 || 27.2 || .492 || . || .706 || 5.4 || 1.6 || .2 || .6 || 13.8
|- align="center" bgcolor="#f0f0f0"
|  || 16 || 0 || 8.0 || .256 || .000 || 1.000^ || 0.8 || 1.1 || .3 || .1 || 1.8
|- align="center" bgcolor=""
|  || style="background:#FF8800;color:#423189;" | 17 || 16 || 33.5 || .511 || . || .808 || style="background:#FF8800;color:#423189;" | 9.9 || 3.6 || .7 || .5 || 17.4
|- align="center" bgcolor="#f0f0f0"
|  || style="background:#FF8800;color:#423189;" | 17 || 15 || 36.5 || .490 || style="background:#FF8800;color:#423189;" | .455† || .750 || 3.2 || 5.8 || 1.3 || .1 || 10.4
|- align="center" bgcolor=""
|  || style="background:#FF8800;color:#423189;" | 17 || style="background:#FF8800;color:#423189;" | 17 || style="background:#FF8800;color:#423189;" | 37.2 || style="background:#FF8800;color:#423189;" | .590 || . || .671 || 8.7 || 2.4 || .9 || style="background:#FF8800;color:#423189;" | 2.0 || 16.9
|- align="center" bgcolor="#f0f0f0"
|  || style="background:#FF8800;color:#423189;" | 17 || 1 || 14.9 || .549 || .000 || .621 || 3.8 || 0.7 || .3 || .3 || 4.4
|- align="center" bgcolor=""
|  || 10 || 0 || 4.3 || .438 || .000 || .500 || 1.0 || 0.2 || .2 || .0 || 1.8
|- align="center" bgcolor="#f0f0f0"
|  || 15 || 0 || 10.1 || .478 || . || style="background:#FF8800;color:#423189;" | .941^ || 1.3 || 0.5 || .4 || .3 || 4.0
|- align="center" bgcolor=""
|  || 16 || 0 || 6.9 || .385 || 1.000† || .667 || 1.5 || 0.4 || .1 || .1 || 1.6
|- align="center" bgcolor="#f0f0f0"
|  || style="background:#FF8800;color:#423189;" | 17 || 2 || 13.1 || .375 || .222 || .875 || 0.5 || 2.2 || .7 || .0 || 5.3
|}

† – Minimum 5 three-pointers made.
^ – Minimum 10 free throws made.

Transactions

Trades

Free agents

Additions

Subtractions

References

 Standings on Basketball Reference

Phoenix Suns seasons
Ph